Studzieniec  is a village in the administrative district of Gmina Kożuchów, within Nowa Sól County, Lubusz Voivodeship, in western Poland.

The village has a population of 741.

References

Studzieniec